Virgin Islands, also known as the United States Virgin Islands and officially as the Virgin Islands of the United States, competed at the 2016 Summer Olympics in Rio de Janeiro, Brazil, from 5 to 21 August 2016. This was the territory's twelfth appearance at the Summer Olympics.

The Virgin Islands Olympic Committee selected a team of seven athletes, five men and two women, to compete in four different sports at the Games. This was the same number of athletes and one more sport than at London in 2012.

Three of the athletes had also competed four years earlier, including triple jumper Muhammad Halim and sprinter LaVerne Jones-Ferrette, who headed to her fourth straight Games as the oldest and most experienced member (aged 35) of the team. Laser sailor and Pan American Games finalist Cy Thompson led his delegation as the flag bearer for the Virgin Islands in the opening ceremony.

The US Virgin Islands, however, failed to win a single Olympic medal in Rio de Janeiro. The nation's previous medal feat happened at the 1988 Summer Olympics in Seoul, where sailor Peter Holmberg bagged the silver in the Finn class.

Athletics (track and field)
 
Athletes from the Virgin Islands achieved qualifying standards in the following athletics events (up to a maximum of 3 athletes in each event):

Track & road events

Field events

Boxing

Virgin Islands entered one boxer to compete in the Olympic boxing tournament in the men's super heavyweight division. Clayton Laurent claimed his Olympic spot with a box-off victory at the 2016 American Qualification Tournament in Buenos Aires, Argentina.

Sailing
 
Sailors from the Virgin Islands qualified one boat in each of the following classes through the 2014 ISAF Sailing World Championships, the individual fleet Worlds, and North American qualifying regattas.

M = Medal race; EL = Eliminated – did not advance into the medal race

Swimming

Virgin Islands received a Universality invitation from FINA to send two swimmers (one male and one female) to the Olympics.

See also
Virgin Islands at the 2015 Pan American Games

References

External links 
 
 

Nations at the 2016 Summer Olympics
2016
Summer Olympics